Marriage of Affection is a 1944 German historical drama film directed by Carl Froelich and starring Henny Porten, Elisabeth Flickenschildt and Käthe Dyckhoff. It was released as a direct sequel to The Buchholz Family.

The film was shot at the Tempelhof Studios in Berlin.

Cast

References

Bibliography 
 Hans-Michael Bock and Tim Bergfelder. The Concise Cinegraph: An Encyclopedia of German Cinema. Berghahn Books, 2009.

External links 
 

1944 films
1940s historical drama films
German historical drama films
Films of Nazi Germany
1940s German-language films
Films directed by Carl Froelich
UFA GmbH films
German sequel films
Films based on German novels
Films set in Berlin
Films set in the 19th century
Films shot at Tempelhof Studios
German black-and-white films
1944 drama films
1940s German films